Payne's grey is a dark blue-grey colour used in painting. It can be used as a mixer in place of black. Since it is less intense than black, it is easier to get the right shade when using it as a mixer. Originally a mixture of iron blue (Prussian blue), yellow ochre and crimson lake, Payne's grey now is often a mixture of blue (ultramarine or phthalocyanine) and black or of ultramarine and burnt sienna.

The colour is named after William Payne, who painted watercolours in the late 18th century.

The first recorded use of Payne's grey as a colour name in English was in 1835.

The source of the colour displayed below is the Robert Ridgway color list, entered onto the Internet from his 1912 book Color Standards and Color Nomenclature.

The normalized colour coordinates for Payne's grey are identical to dark electric blue, which was formalized as a color in the ISCC–NBS system in 1955.

See also
 List of colors

References

Inorganic pigments